Yevdokya Fyodorovna Karpova (March 8, 1923 – December 5, 2000) was a Soviet and Russian politician and member of the Communist Party of the Soviet Union.

She was vice-chairman of the Council of Ministers of the RSFSR in 1966–1987.

References

1923 births
2000 deaths
20th-century Russian women politicians
People from Ryazan Governorate
Moscow State Textile University alumni
Members of the Supreme Soviet of the Russian Soviet Federative Socialist Republic, 1967–1971
Members of the Supreme Soviet of the Russian Soviet Federative Socialist Republic, 1971–1975
Members of the Supreme Soviet of the Russian Soviet Federative Socialist Republic, 1975–1980
Members of the Supreme Soviet of the Russian Soviet Federative Socialist Republic, 1985–1990
Tenth convocation members of the Supreme Soviet of the Soviet Union
Recipients of the Order of Lenin
Recipients of the Order of the Red Banner of Labour
Russian communists
Soviet women in politics
Burials in Troyekurovskoye Cemetery